Michael Walsh (May 4, 1810 – March 17, 1859) was a United States representative from New York.

Early life
Born in Youghal, Cork, Ireland, he completed preparatory studies, was graduated from Trinity College, Dublin and emigrated to the United States, settling in Baltimore, Maryland. He learned the lithographic printing trade, and moved to New York City.

Career
In 1843 he established the Subterranean, which he stopped after two years when convicted for the publication of  libel. He was a member of the New York State Assembly (New York Co.) in 1847, 1848 and 1852. He was elected as a Democrat to the 33rd United States Congress, holding office from March 4, 1853, to March 3, 1855. He was an unsuccessful candidate for re-election in 1854, and after his term in Congress was employed as a newspaper reporter. He died in New York City in 1859; interment was in Green-Wood Cemetery, Brooklyn.

References

Ernst, Robert. One and Only Mike Walsh. The New-York Historical Society Quarterly 36 (January 1952): 43–65.

External links

1810 births
Alumni of Trinity College Dublin
1859 deaths
19th-century Irish people
19th-century American newspaper publishers (people)
Democratic Party members of the New York State Assembly
Burials at Green-Wood Cemetery
Irish emigrants to the United States (before 1923)
Democratic Party members of the United States House of Representatives from New York (state)
19th-century American journalists
American male journalists
19th-century American male writers
19th-century American politicians
People from Youghal